Kalahari Express Airlines (KEA) was an airline based in Windhoek, Namibia. It was formed in 1998, operating from Eros Airport. KEA merged with Air Namibia in 2001.

Code data

ICAO Code: KEA (not current)
Callsign: KALAHARI (not current)

History
The airline was set to start service in 1997, though as of 1998, service had not yet started. The airline had difficulty in obtaining loans to purchase two Fokker F28-Mark 3000 from Australia. Destinations to be served from Windhoek were Johannesburg and Cape Town.

References

External links
 Picture of a Fokker F-28-3000 Fellowship of KEA

Defunct airlines of Namibia
Airlines established in 1998
Airlines disestablished in 2001
Namibian companies established in 1998
2001 disestablishments in Namibia